Bulukhta is a rural locality (a settlement) in Belovsky Selsoviet, Altaysky District, Altai Krai, Russia. The population was 8 as of 2013. There is 1 street.

Geography 
Bulukhta is located 47 km south of Altayskoye (the district's administrative centre) by road. Beloye is the nearest rural locality.

References 

Rural localities in Altaysky District, Altai Krai